Challenge Park may refer to:

 Cedar Point's Challenge Park was an area that featured the parks upcharge attractions at Cedar Point in Sandusky, Ohio. Closed and at the end of 2016 for Soak City's (Now Cedar Point Shores) Expansion, Challenge golf, Ripcord, the tickets booth Were removed, earlier in 2016 the Go karts and SkyScraper were removed earlier as well. 

 Valleyfair#Challenge Park, was an area, not directly connected with ValleyFair, that featured the parks up-charge attractions at Valleyfair in Shakopee, Minnesota. It had a club house with an arcade inside, refreshments, and food. It was also the location you would pick up your putters and golf balls for Mini golf. Challenge Park attractions included, Adventure Golf, a Go-Kart track, Bumper Boats, and the Rip-Cord. Challenge park was enclosed with the rest of ValleyFair the year, Steel Venom, was built in 2003.

  Adventure Golf - Opening in 1992 it was a 2 - 18 hole mini golf course which included an "Easy" course and an "Advanced course" it had water elements, water falls, and a mountain. Its last operating season was 2011, closed during the 2012 season and removed and replaced with Picnic Cove.

  Bumper Boats - Opened in 1993 was motorized bumper boats in a pool of water. This ride was removed and relocated to Michigan's Adventure in 2009.

  Go-Karts - Opened in 1991 was a quarter mile racetrack. It was removed in 2013 when ValleyFair moved Route 76 (Antique cars) from inside the park to this location.

  RipCord - Opened in 1996, along with the Wild Thing, at the two new attractions that season! An 180-foot tower pulls 1 to 3 fliers to the top and allows them to free fall, for about 18 stories, until the cord becomes tense and then they swing back and forth. The RipCord is the only attraction left, of what was once Challenge Park. This is still an up-charge attraction.

Valleyfair's Challenge park was closed in 2013 with the removal of the Go-Kart track, the RipCord, is the only surviving attraction of Challenge Park, which is now a part of ValleyFair.